Mi País (lit: My Country) was a political party in Guatemala.

History
Mi País was founded and registered in 2011 and participated in the legislative elections of Guatemala in 2015, it won no seats. The General Secretary of the party is General Alfredo Augusto Rabbé Tejada, brother of former Congress President Luis Rabbé Tejada. The Supreme Electoral Tribunal suspended the party in 2016 for not complying with the imposed economic sanctions.

References

External links

2011 establishments in Guatemala
2020 disestablishments in Guatemala
Centrist parties in North America
Defunct political parties in Guatemala
Political parties disestablished in 2020
Political parties established in 2011